The 18th Lambda Literary Awards were held in 2006, to honor works of LGBT literature published in 2005.

Nominees and winners

References

External links
 18th Lambda Literary Awards

Lambda Literary Awards
Lambda
Lists of LGBT-related award winners and nominees
2006 in LGBT history
2006 awards in the United States